Eugene C. Ceppetelli (July 28, 1942 – June 14, 2018) was an American football center in the National Football League for the Philadelphia Eagles and the New York Giants. He also played seven seasons in the Canadian Football League for the Hamilton Tiger-Cats and the Montreal Alouettes. He played college football at Villanova University.

References

1942 births
2018 deaths
American football centers
Canadian expatriate American football people in the United States
Canadian football centres
Canadian people of Italian descent
Canadian players of American football
Hamilton Tiger-Cats players
Montreal Alouettes players
New York Giants players
Philadelphia Eagles players
Players of Canadian football from Ontario
Sportspeople from Greater Sudbury
Villanova Wildcats football players